David Orth is a Canadian actor.

Life and career
Orth was born and raised in Kitchener, Ontario. His most notable role was as Edward 'Ned' Malone in the TV series Sir Arthur Conan Doyle's The Lost World, which was shot in Australia, which he played from 1999 until 2002, although his appearances in the final season were curtailed due to Australian tax laws. During the shooting of The Lost World, he purchased a home in Australia and met his wife there. Orth voiced Blizzard in Iron Man: Armored Adventures. He has also starred in Beyond Reality, The Ray Bradbury Theatre, the episode "Scarecrow" on the CW's horror/drama series Supernatural, and the two-part premiere of R. L. Stine's The Haunting Hour: The Series.

He has also appeared on stage, including in Colin Thomas's Flesh and Blood  in 1991.

Filmography

Film

Television

External links

References 

Living people
Canadian male television actors
Male actors from Kitchener, Ontario
Year of birth missing (living people)